Baidub is a village in Ulilin district, Merauke Regency in South Papua province, Indonesia. Its population is 223.

Climate
Baidub has a tropical rainforest climate (Af) with heavy to very heavy rainfall year-round.

References

Villages in South Papua